The Church of Santa Maria Maggiore, also known as Sanctuary of the Spoliation, is a church in Assisi, Umbria, central Italy.

The current structure dates from the 11th-12th centuries, although it was built on a pre-existing Palaeo-Christian church; the latter had been in turn erected above a Roman edifice, the so-called "Propertius' Domus" or a temple dedicated to Apollo or, according to the tradition, to Janus. The church served as the city's cathedral until 1036, when the title was moved to the current Cathedral, the church of San Rufino.

It has an undecorated façade divided vertically by pilasters. The entrance door is surmounted by an ogival arch and a rose window, dated 1163 and signed by one Johannes, identified by some with Giovanni da Gubbio, the architect of the Assisi Cathedral. The bell tower, built in the 14th century, is in Gothic-Romanesque style.

The interior has a basilica plan with a nave and two aisles, separated by pillars.  The walls house fresco remains and paintings of the 14th-15th centuries, including a Pietà attributed to Tiberio d'Assisi and works by Pace di Bartolo. It is likely that the walls were entirely frescoed originally. There is also a panel of Madonna with Child from Pinturicchio's school.

The crypt, belonging to the 10th-century church, is home to Roman architectural elements, such as decorated walls, pavements, capitals from "Propertius' Domus", and a sarcophagus with a sculpted cross, dating from the 9th century. From the annexed garden remains of the ancient city's walls can be seen.

The Church holds the relics of the Blessed Carlo Acutis, making it a site of pilgrimage for many of the Catholic faithful.

References

Sources

External links

Official website of the Sanctuary of the Spoliation 

Maria Maggiore
Romanesque architecture in Assisi
12th-century Roman Catholic church buildings in Italy